Mihailo II was the King of Duklja from 1101 to 1102. He was the eldest son of King Constantine Bodin of Duklja and Queen Jaquinta. He succeeded his father on the throne of Duklja, but soon lost ground to cousins, pretenders to the throne. left without support, he abdicated and retreated to monastery.

See also
 Duklja
 Vojislavljević dynasty
 Grand Principality of Serbia

References

Sources

 
 
 
 

Vojislavljević dynasty
Rulers of Duklja
Montenegrin Roman Catholics